Jaccoud is a French surname. Notable people with the surname include:

Pierre Jaccoud (1905–1996), Swiss lawyer and politician
Jaccoud case
Sigismond Jaccoud (1830–1913), Swiss physician

French-language surnames